Emiliano Germán Agüero (born 21 January 1995) is an Argentine professional footballer who plays as a midfielder for River Plate (A).

Career
Agüero started off in the system of Argentine Primera División team River Plate (BA), he was an unused substitute on two occasions in the 2013–14 campaign for matches against Atlético de Rafaela and Estudiantes. February 2015 saw him loaned out to fellow Primera División team Argentinos Juniors. Twelve appearances followed as the club finished 20th. He returned to River Plate ahead of 2016, but was immediately loaned out again to San Martín for eighteen months. He appeared just twice in the 2016 season for San Martín, prior to playing thirteen times in 2016–17 as they placed twenty-second.

San Martín signed Agüero permanently in June 2017. His first appearance as a full-time San Martín player came on 27 August versus Patronato, while he scored his first goal for them and of his senior career on 1 October against Rosario Central. In August 2018, Agüero made a move to Guillermo Brown in Primera B Nacional. Six appearances subsequently occurred, which preceded Agüero switching to Paraguayan football with River Plate (A) of the Paraguayan Primera División in January 2019.

Career statistics
.

References

External links

1995 births
Living people
People from San Isidro Partido
Argentine footballers
Association football midfielders
Argentine expatriate footballers
Expatriate footballers in Paraguay
Argentine expatriate sportspeople in Paraguay
Argentine Primera División players
Primera Nacional players
Club Atlético River Plate footballers
Argentinos Juniors footballers
San Martín de San Juan footballers
Guillermo Brown footballers
River Plate (Asunción) footballers
Sportspeople from Buenos Aires Province